Ishkoman Aghost pass (el. 15,050 ft.) is a high mountain pass in Pakistan. It is also spelled as Ishkurman Aghost and Ishkuman Aghost pass. Another name for this pass is Panji Pass. This mountain pass connects Ishkoman Valley to Yasin Valley in Gizar, Gilgit Baltistan (Northern Areas) Province of Pakistan. 

Mountain passes of Gilgit-Baltistan